Luc Montpellier is a Canadian cinematographer. He is most noted for his work on the 2013 film It Was You Charlie, for which he was a Canadian Screen Award nominee for Best Cinematography at the 3rd Canadian Screen Awards in 2014.

He has also been a Canadian Society of Cinematographers award winner for Best Cinematography in a Dramatic Short in 2000 for the short film Soul Cages, and a Gemini Award winner for Best Photography in a Dramatic Program or Series at the 18th Gemini Awards in 2003 for the television film Hemingway vs. Callaghan.

He is a native of the Chelmsford neighbourhood in Sudbury, Ontario, and an alumnus of the film school at Ryerson University.

Filmography

Film

Television

References

External links

Canadian cinematographers
Canadian Screen Award winners
People from Greater Sudbury
Toronto Metropolitan University alumni
Franco-Ontarian people
Living people
Year of birth missing (living people)